Lee Ivey Anderson (born January 6, 1957) is a Republican member of the Georgia State Senate, representing the 24th district.

Georgia General Assembly

In 2008, incumbent Republican State Representative Barry Fleming of Georgia's 117th House District decided to retire to run for Congress and challenge incumbent U.S. Congressman Paul Broun of Georgia's 10th congressional district. Anderson decided to run here and won the Republican primary with 69% of the vote. He won the general election unopposed. In 2010, he won re-election to a second term unopposed.

In 2021, Anderson sponsored legislation to disband the Lincoln County Board of Elections and allow the Republican-led General Assembly to appoint a new board. Subsequently, the new board sought to remove all polling places except one. Anderson's district includes Lincoln County.

2012 congressional election

Anderson ran in the newly redrawn Georgia's 12th congressional district, currently held by U.S. Congressman John Barrow (D-Savannah). Lee was endorsed by Georgia Right to Life and signed the Americans for Tax Reform Taxpayer Protection Pledge.

On paper, Anderson had a lot in his favor. The 12th had been significantly redrawn in redistricting, and now had a significant Republican tilt. Had the district existed in 2008, John McCain would have won it with 58 percent of the vote.  By comparison, Barack Obama won the old 12th with 54 percent of the vote.  However, on Election Day, Anderson lost, taking only 46.30% even as Mitt Romney won the district handily.  According to a post-mortem editorial in the Augusta Chronicle, Anderson was almost invisible during the campaign.  He never debated Barrow, and made only cursory appearances before the media.

See also

 Georgia General Assembly

References

External links
 State Rep. Lee Anderson official Georgia Legislature site
 Lee Anderson for Congress official campaign site
 
 Biography at Ballotpedia
 Financial information (state office) at the National Institute for Money in State Politics
 Campaign contributions at OpenSecrets.org

Living people
Republican Party members of the Georgia House of Representatives
People from Grovetown, Georgia
21st-century American politicians
1957 births